The Avon Championships of Cincinnati is a defunct WTA Tour affiliated women's tennis tournament played from 1980 to 1982. It was held in Cincinnati, Ohio in the United States and played on indoor carpet courts.

Past finals

Singles

Doubles

References

External links
 WTA Results Archive

 
Defunct tennis tournaments in the United States
Carpet court tennis tournaments
Indoor tennis tournaments
Tennis tournaments in Ohio
Sports competitions in Cincinnati
Recurring sporting events established in 1980
Recurring sporting events disestablished in 1982
1980 establishments in Ohio
1982 disestablishments in Ohio